Norilana Books is an independent publishing company, founded in August 2006 and based in the United States. It is operated and owned by Vera Nazarian. Norilana publishes reprints of previously published Science Fiction and Fantasy works, including the novels of Modean Moon. More recently, Norilana has been publishing several series of original anthologies, including Clockwork Phoenix, edited by Mike Allen, Warrior Wisewoman, edited by Roby James, and Lace and Blade edited by Deborah J. Ross.  The company was selected to continue the publication of Marion Zimmer Bradley's Sword and Sorceress series of short story anthologies, edited by Elisabeth Waters. Norilana Books also publishes classics of world literature under the Norilana Books Classics imprint and works of genre fiction including young adult fantasy under the YA Angst imprint. Other imprints include: Curiosities, Leda, and TaLeKa, which is dedicated to author Tanith Lee.

Books published by Norilana
Mike Allen, Clockwork Phoenix, 2008
Mike Allen, Clockwork Phoenix 2, 2009. Stories from Clockwork Phoenix 2 were nominated for the Nebula Award and the WSFA Small Press Award.
Eugie Foster, Returning My Sister's Face, 2009
John Grant, Leaving Fortusa, 2008
Roby James, Warrior Wisewoman, 2008
Roby James, Warrior Wisewoman 2, 2009
Roby James, Warrior Wisewoman 3, 2010
Tanith Lee, Sounds and Furies, 2010
William Sanders, East of the Sun & West of Fort Smith, 2008
Sherwood Smith, A Posse of Princesses, 2008
Sherwood Smith, A Stranger to Command, 2008
Catherynne M. Valente, Guide to Folktales in Fragile Dialects, 2008
Elisabeth Waters, Marion Zimmer Bradley's Sword & Sorceress XXII, 2007
Elisabeth Waters, Marion Zimmer Bradley's Sword & Sorceress XXIII, 2008
Elisabeth Waters, Marion Zimmer Bradley's Sword & Sorceress XXIV, 2009

References

External links
 www.norilana.com—Norilana Books website
 norilanabooks.livejournal.com—Norilana Books blog
 Darley, June, "Roby James of Norilana Books explains why having the idea is only a fraction of the writer’s job", EssentialWriters.com, November 16, 2009.
 Horton, Rich, "Book Review: Norilana Roundup", Fantasy Magazine, November 2009.

American speculative fiction publishers
Publishing companies established in 2006
Science fiction publishers
Small press publishing companies